Aqaba Airport ❲also known as King Hussein Int'l Airport ❳ is an airport located in the vicinity of Industrial City (Aqaba International Industrial Estate – ), northern suburb of Aqaba in Jordan.

Overview
The location of Aqaba is unusual, for within a 15 miles (24 km) radius there are three other countries, Egypt, Saudi Arabia and Israel. The airport has a single runway equipped with a category 1 instrument landing system (ILS). Thanks to its normally excellent weather conditions, the airport is rarely closed, though strong southerly winds bring sandstorms across the Red Sea from Egypt.

The airport has a single 28,000 sq ft (2,600 m2) terminal building with just one departure gate and one baggage carousel, though the building is being extended. The facilities can cope when there is one aircraft to be handled, but on some occasions when there are three aircraft being turned around simultaneously things can become somewhat crowded. The capacity of the Terminal at present is 1.5 million passengers a year. There are also separate buildings for General Aviation and a Royal Pavilion – King Abdullah II owns a palace along the shoreline and regularly visits. The Royal Jordanian Air Academy are regular visitors on land-away cross country training exercises. Annual passenger figures have risen from around 20,000 per year in the early days to over 90,000 in the year 2000. There are currently around 3,000 aircraft movements a year. A significant proportion of these are training flights, including those of the Royal Jordanian Air Force.

The largest operator at Aqaba is Royal Jordanian. It operates about 10 flights a week to Amman, though extras are frequently scheduled, sometimes to coincide with passenger changeover on cruise ships. The airline operates Embraer E175 Regional Jets that undertake the journey in 45 minutes. These jets have replaced the Bombardier Dash 8 Q400 aircraft used by the Royal Wings subsidiary and have a total of 72 seats, 10 of which are business class. The airline also undertakes about six charter flights to Europe, with European charter airlines adding a further dozen. Aqaba is an airport that can handle the largest jets.

Just across the border in Israel and nominally serving Eilat a new airport called Ramon Airport opened in 2019 despite earlier proposals to jointly develop airport infrastructure in the region following the Israel Jordan Peace Treaty of 1994.

Facilities

Annual Capacity 1,000,000, The airport has 4 check-in desks, 2 gates, a cargo building and a cargo apron together with a parallel taxiway. The airport has one baggage claim belt, 200 short-term parking spaces, a post office, bank, cafeterias, VIP lounge, duty-free shop, and gift shops, and a clinic. The airport includes also buildings for the Ayla Aviation Academy, the Royal Jordanian Academy, the Aero Wings for Industry's assembly plant for light planes, the Jordan Private Jets Services (JPJets)'s private jet terminal, and the Al Baddad International Group's maintenance centre. A new cargo terminal (6000 m2) and a new cargo apron (220 m × 600 m) opened in January 2005.

Airlines and destinations

The following airlines operate regular scheduled and charter flights at Aqaba Airport:

References

External links
 King Hussein International Airport - Jordan Airport Global Website
 Official facebook page

Aqaba
Airports in Jordan